Curse of Akakor is an American reality show docuseries that premiered on August 11, 2019 on Facebook Watch. It follows six investigators in the Amazon rainforest searching for the lost city of Akakor, and detailing past experiences of explorers who unsuccessfully made the same search. Viewers will be able to give their own theories after watching episodes on the program's Facebook page.

The program was announced in June 2019. It is produced by Australian-based production company Beyond International. The last episode was posted on October 27, 2019.

Cast
 Paul Connolly - investigative journalist
 Bobby Chacon - former FBI agent
 Brennon Edwards - technology expert
 Megan Hine - survival expert
 Dr. Karina Oliani - wilderness doctor
 Dr. Martin Pepper - geologist and explorer

See also
 List of original programs distributed by Facebook Watch

References

External links

Facebook Watch original programming
2010s American reality television series
2010s American television series endings
2019 American television series debuts
2019 American television series endings
English-language television shows
American non-fiction web series
Television series by Beyond Television Productions